The Philippine Legion of Honor was established by President Manuel Roxas, through Philippine Army Circular No. 60 dated July 3, 1947. The Philippine Legion of Honor was patterned after the Legion of Merit of the United States of America, and was meant to honor both civilians and members of the military, Filipino or foreign. Originally, like the U.S. Legion of Merit, the Philippine Legion of Honor had four classes, known as degrees, with Legionnaire being the basic rank, and Chief Commander being the highest. With the reform of the Philippine system of orders and decorations in 2003, the Philippine Legion of Honor's classes were renamed "ranks" instead of "degrees", and the ranks expanded.

Criteria
Today,  the Philippine Legion of Honor is conferred upon a Filipino or foreign citizen in recognition of valuable and meritorious service in relation to the military affairs of the Republic of the Philippines. It is thus the primary order of military merit of the Republic of the Philippines.

To signify the importance of the civil service in military affairs in the preservation of the honor of the Republic of the Philippines and in nation building, the Philippine Legion of Honor is conferred on the anniversary of the declaration of Philippine Independence.

The Philippine Legion of Honor may be awarded by the Secretary of National Defense in the name and by authority of the President of the Philippines.

Ranks

The civilian division of the Philippine Legion of Honor is composed of the following ranks:

Chief Commander (CCLH) (Punong Komandante) - Conferred upon a civilian for life achievement in public service not otherwise qualifying for the Quezon Service Cross; or upon a former or incumbent head of state and/or of government
Grand Commander (GCLH) (Marangal na Komandante) – Conferred upon a civilian for singular acts of service with a tangible impact on the Philippine military sphere; or upon a crown prince, Vice President, Senate President, Speaker of the House, Chief Justice or the equivalent, foreign minister or other official of cabinet rank; or upon an Ambassador, Undersecretary, Assistant Secretary, or other person of a rank similar or equivalent to the foregoing for life achievement in the military field
Grand Officer (GOLH) (Marangal na Pinuno) – Conferred upon a civilian for acts of exemplary merit benefiting the Republic of the Philippines; or upon a chargé d'affaires, e.p., Minister, Minister Counselor, Consul General heading a consular post, Executive Director, or other person of a rank similar or equivalent to the foregoing
Commander (CLH) (Komandante) – Conferred upon a civilian for acts of conspicuous merit benefiting the Republic of the Philippines; or upon a Chargé d'affaires, a.i., Counselor, First Secretary, Consul General in the consular section of an Embassy, Consular officer with a personal rank higher than Second Secretary, Director, or other person of a rank similar or equivalent to the foregoing
Officer (OLH) (Pinuno) – Conferred upon a civilian for acts of commendable merit benefiting the Republic of the Philippines; or upon a Second Secretary, Consul, Assistant Director, or other person of a rank similar or equivalent to the foregoing
Legionnaire (LLH) (Lehiyonaryo) – Conferred upon a civilian for acts of merit benefiting the Republic of the Philippines; or upon a Third Secretary, Vice Consul, Attaché, Principal Assistant, or other person of a rank similar or equivalent to the foregoing.

The Armed Forces of the Philippines has its own regulations governing the conferment of the Philippine Legion of Honor.

Notable recipients

Chief Commander (CCLH)

Emilio Aguinaldo, 1957, former President of the Philippines
Akihito, Emperor of Japan, 2002
Hassanal Bolkiah, Sultan of Brunei Darussalam, 1998
Gregorio Pio Catapang, 2015, Chief of Staff of the Armed Forces of the Philippines.
Emmanuel T. Bautista, 2014, Chief of Staff of the Armed Forces of the Philippines.
Chiang Kai-shek, 1949, President of the Republic of China
Hillary Clinton, 2013, former United States Secretary of State
Dwight D. Eisenhower, 1961, former President of the United States
John W. Foss, 1981, Chief, JUSMAG Philippines
Francisco Franco, 1951, head of the Spanish state
Daniel Inouye, United States Senator
José P. Laurel, 1959, former President of the Philippines
Chino Roces, 1988, founder and owner of Associated Broadcasting Company and the Manila Times
Jaime L. Cardinal Sin, 1992, Archbishop of Manila
Lorenzo M. Tañada, 1986, Senator of the Philippines, Post-war Solicitor General, Nationalist and Human Rights advocate
Ferdinand Marcos, 1972, former President of the Philippines
Imelda Marcos, First Lady of the Philippines
Douglas MacArthur, 1961, Philippine field marshal
Sergio Osmeña, 1994, former President of the Philippines
Fidel V. Ramos, former President of the Philippines
Jesse Robredo, Secretary of the Interior and Local Government, given posthumously on August 28, 2012.
Franklin D. Roosevelt, 1947, former President of the United States (posthumous)
Soekarno, 1951, President of Indonesia
Maxwell D. Taylor, 1955, U.S. Chairman of the Joint Chiefs of Staff
Eduardo Año - 48th Chief of Staff of the Armed Forces of the Philippines

Grand Commander (GCLH)

Jaime Augusto Zobel de Ayala, 2010
Fernando Zobel de Ayala, 2010
Jaime Zobel de Ayala, 2009
Gilbert Teodoro, 2009, former Secretary of National Defense
Emilio Yap, 2006
Napoleon G. Rama, 2011, Constitutional Commissioner

Grand Officer (GOLH)

 Teodoro Locsin, Jr., 2002
 Roman Kintanar - 2007, for his work in various international cooperations for tropical cyclone and earthquake disaster mitigation programs

Commander (CLH)

Try Sutrisno
R.E. Martadinata
Wismoyo Arismunandar
L. B. Moerdani
Widodo Budidarmo
Sudomo
Benigno Aquino Jr., 1954
Eulogio Balao
Sotero B. Cabahug, 1959
Joseph J. Cappucci
Tomas Confesor
Carlos P. Romulo
Gen. Alfredo M. Santos
Lt. Gen. Cardozo Luna
Bernard W. Kearney, 1959
Jorge B. Vargas, 1960
Abdul Haris Nasution, 1963
Juan Ponce Enrile, 1974 and 1986
Washington SyCip, 1991
Halbi Mohd Yussof, 2006
Moeldoko, 2014
Harry B. Harris Jr, 2018

Officer (OLH)

Benigno Aquino Jr., 1950
Florentino Das, 11 May 1956 (for exceptional feat of traveling by sea using his homemade boat from Hawaii to Siargao island
Manuel P. Manahan, 1950 (for the wartime publication of the underground newspaper Liberator)
Manny Pacquiao, 2008 (Boxer, Philippine Army reservist)
Efren Reyes, 1999 (Professional Billiards Player)
Paeng Nepomuceno, 1999 (Tenpin Bowling Athlete)

Legionnaire (LLH)

Teodoro M. Locsin, 1947, World War II guerilla

This article incorporates public domain text from the library of the Philippine Congress.

References

Citations

Bibliography
 The AFP Adjutant General, AFP Awards and Decorations Handbook, 1995, 1997, 2014 OTAG.
 

 
Legion
Military awards and decorations of the Philippines